Beremiany is the name of two villages in Ukraine:

Beremiany, Buchach Raion 
Beremiany, Kolomyia Raion